The Série 0100 are a type of single carriage diesel railcar built for Portuguese Railways (CP). They were built by NOHAB of Trollhättan in Sweden in 1948. They were extensively refurbished in 1980. As of 2012 only six units are still in Portugal; the other six were sold to Argentina and the rest were destroyed by fire or accidents. As of 2013 none are in service in Portugal.

Three similar, but smaller, Série 9100 railcars were also supplied by NOHAB in 1949 for use on the metre gauge Tâmega line in northern Portugal.

References

Diesel multiple units of Portugal